Joan II, Countess of Auvergne and Boulogne, also known as Jeanne de Boulogne, and Joan, Duchess of Berry, (1378 – c. 1424), was sovereign Countess of Auvergne and Boulogne from 1394 until 1424. She was the daughter of John II, Count of Auvergne (died 1394), and second wife of John, Duke of Berry. She is arguably most famous for saving the life of her nephew, King Charles VI of France, during the disastrous Bal des Ardents (Ball of the Burning Men).

Life
Joan was born around 1378 to John II, Count of Auvergne and Boulogne and his wife 	Aliénor de Comminges. Joan's grandfather, John I, had been an uncle of Queen Joanna of France, a previous heiress to Auvergne and Boulogne; John inherited the counties when his great-nephew, Joanna's son from a previous marriage, Philip of Burgundy, died without issue. Joan's mother was a descendant of Peter II of Courtenay, Emperor of Constantinople, who in turn descended from Louis VI of France.

In 1389, Joan was married to John, Duke of Berry, a son of John II of France, whose wife had died in the previous year. They had no children.

Role in Bal des Ardents
At the age of fifteen, Joan was present at the infamous Bal des Ardents given by Queen Isabeau, wife of the Duke of Berry's nephew King Charles, on 28 January 1393. During this, the King and five nobles dressed up as wildmen, clad "in costumes of linen cloth sewn onto their bodies and soaked in resinous wax or pitch to hold a covering of frazzled hemp," and proceeded to dance about chained together. At length, the King became separated from the others, and made his way to the Duchess, who jokingly refused to let him wander off again until he told her his name. When Charles' brother, Louis of Orléans, accidentally set the other dancers on fire, Joan swathed the King in her skirts, protecting him from the flames and saving his life.

Sovereign
Upon her father's death in 1394, Joan became Countess of Auvergne and Boulogne. Joan was widowed upon the death of the Duke of Berry in 1416. She married Georges de La Trémoille soon after; however, they produced no children, and the counties passed to her cousin, Marie, upon her death in 1424.

Ancestry

Notes

References
 Echols, Anne and Marty Williams, An Annotated Index of Medieval Women, Markus Weiner Publishing Inc., 1992.
 
 The Encyclopædia Britannica, Vol.3, Ed. Hugh Chisholm, 1911.

1378 births
1424 deaths
French countesses
Duchesses of Berry
Countesses of Montpensier
Auvergne, Countess of, Joan II
14th-century women rulers
15th-century women rulers
Counts of Auvergne
14th-century French people
14th-century French women
15th-century French people
15th-century French women